Hyacinthe Robillard d'Avrigny (1675, Caen – 24 April 1719) was a French Jesuit.

Works 
 Mémoires chronologiques et dogmatiques : pour servir à l’histoire ecclésiastique depuis 1600 jusqu'en 1716 ; avec des réflexions & des remarques critiques, Nîmes, Pierre Beaume, 1781
 Mémoires pour servir à l’histoire universelle de l’Europe, depuis 1600 jusqu’en 1716. Avec des réflexions & remarques critiques, Paris, Veuve R. Mazières, 1724-1725

1675 births
1719 deaths
French historians of religion
18th-century French Jesuits
Clergy from Caen